Episolder is a monotypic genus of Asian dwarf spiders containing the single species, Episolder finitimus. It was first described by A. V. Tanasevitch in 1996, and has only been found in Russia.

See also
 List of Linyphiidae species (A–H)

References

Linyphiidae
Monotypic Araneomorphae genera
Spiders of Russia